Frye is a surname. Notable people with the surname include:

Channing Frye (born 1983), basketball player
Charlie Frye (born 1981), football player for the Oakland Raiders
Don Frye (born 1965), mixed martial arts fighter
Donna Frye (born 1952), San Diego city councilwoman
Dwight Frye (1899–1943), American actor
George Frederick Frye (1833–1912), Seattle pioneer and the City Council member.
Jack Frye (1904–1959), American aviation pioneer
John Frye (1933–2005), Scottish footballer
Joseph Frye (1712–1794), colonial American soldier and general
Marilyn Frye (born 1941), American philosophy professor and feminist theorist
Mark Frye (born 1957), contemporary American composer
Northrop Frye (1912–1991), Canadian literary critic
Richard N. Frye (1920–2014), American scholar of Iranian history
Sean Frye (born 1966), American child actor
Shirley M. Frye, American mathematics educator
Soleil Moon Frye (born 1976), American actress best known for playing Punky Brewster
Spencer Frye (born 1967), American politician
Taylor Frye (1864–1946), American politician and educator
Theodore Christian Frye (1869–1962), American botanist
Thomas Frye (c. 1710–1762), Anglo-Irish painter
Thomas Frye (Rhode Island politician) (1666–1748), Deputy Governor of colony of Rhode Island
Virgil Frye (1930–2012), American actor
Walter Frye (died 1474), English Renaissance composer
William P. Frye (1830–1911), U.S. Senator from Maine
Kelly Frye (1984), American actress

See also
The Frye Company, a bootmaker
Frye Computer Systems, a software company
Frye standard, a test to determine the admissibility of scientific evidence in United States courts
Fry (disambiguation)
Frye Island, Maine, named for Joseph Frye
Fryeburg, Maine, named for Joseph Frye

Scottish surnames
English-language surnames